Steven Kaplan  was the Secretary of the Pennsylvania Department of Banking.

References

Living people
State cabinet secretaries of Pennsylvania
Year of birth missing (living people)